Thijsje Oenema (born 6 June 1988) is a Dutch speed skater and "short-track sprinter".  She is specialised on the short distances.

Oenema skates for the VPZ skating team and is a member for skating club S.T.D. Sint Nicolaasga. Her breakthrough was during the 2009 KNSB Dutch Single Distance Championships, winning the bronze medal at the 500 m. This was very surprising because in the 2007–08 season she was not able to skate because of Pfeiffer's disease. With this third place she qualified for the first time for the World Cup.

Oenema also showed that season that she is also very strong at the 100 m. In 2006 and 2007 she was already the Dutch champion at this distance. In 2009, she regained her title she lost in the year before by winning on the ice of Lekkerkerk. In the same season she took the title at the Dutch championships supersprint.

Although her start of the season 2010 was weak, she managed to qualify for the Olympics in Vancouver by beating Marianne Timmer in a skate-off.

Speed skating

Results

Medals

References

1988 births
Dutch female speed skaters
Speed skaters at the 2010 Winter Olympics
Olympic speed skaters of the Netherlands
Sportspeople from Heerenveen
Living people
World Single Distances Speed Skating Championships medalists
20th-century Dutch women
21st-century Dutch women